Nico Gutjahr (born 15 May 1993) is a German football midfielder who plays for Bahlinger SC in the Regionalliga Südwest.

External links 
 
 

1993 births
Living people
German footballers
Association football midfielders
Würzburger Kickers players
SG Sonnenhof Großaspach players
SSV Ulm 1846 players
Bahlinger SC players
3. Liga players
Regionalliga players
Landesliga players